The Balkans theatre or Balkan campaign was a theatre of World War I fought between the Central Powers (Austria-Hungary, Bulgaria, Germany and the Ottoman Empire) and the Allies (Serbia, Montenegro, France, the United Kingdom, Russia, Italy, and later Greece).

The campaign began in 1914 with three failed Austro-Hungarian offensives into Serbia. A new attempt a year later by the combined forces of Austria-Hungary, Germany and Bulgaria led to the conquest and occupation of Serbia and Montenegro. The Serbian army did not surrender but retreated through the mountains of Albania and was evacuated to Corfu before reforming in Salonika a few months later. On the Macedonian front, the Royal Serbian Army joined the Franco-British Allied Army of the Orient and fought a protracted trench war against Bulgarian and German forces. The allied army presence in Greece resulted in the National Schism on whether Greece should join the Allies or remain neutral, which would benefit the Central Powers. Greece eventually joined the Allied Powers in 1917. In September 1918, the Vardar Offensive broke through the Bulgarian lines, forcing them to surrender. The liberation of Serbia, Albania and Montenegro soon followed.

Overview
A major cause of the war was the hostility between Serbia and Austria-Hungary, where the First World War began. Serbia held out against Austria-Hungary for more than a year before it was defeated in late 1915.

Dalmatia was a strategic region during the war that Italy and Serbia intended to seize from Austria-Hungary. Italy entered the war upon agreeing to the Treaty of London, 1915, which guaranteed Italy a substantial portion of Dalmatia.

After the war at in the Treaty of Versailles Italy was only given a small piece of Dalmatia, due to the new countries that were formed. This resulted in widespread resentment and fear among the general public, which is one of the reasons why Italy joined the Axis Powers in WWII.

The retreating Serbian troops entered Albania, which caused the Central Powers to invade Albania. The Serbian troops were evacuated by Italian transport ships in the Adriatic sea. They were transported to Corfu and other Greek islands before they were moved to Thessaloniki. The Allies had landed in neutral Greece to form the Macedonian front.

In 1917, Greece entered the war in favour for the Allies. In 1918, the multinational Allied Army of the Orient, based in northern Greece, finally launched an offensive, which drove Bulgaria to seek a peace treaty, recaptured Serbia and halted only at the border of Hungary in November 1918.

Serbian–Montenegrin campaign

The Serbian army managed to defend against the larger Austro-Hungarian Army due to a Russian invasion from the north. In 1915, Austria-Hungary placed additional soldiers on the southern front and succeeded in engaging Bulgaria as an ally.

Soon, the Serbian army was attacked from the north and the east, forcing a retreat to Greece. Despite the loss, the retreat was successful, and the Serbian army remained operational in Greece with a newly-established base.

Italian campaign

Prior to direct intervention in the war, Italy had occupied the port of Vlorë in Albania in December 1914. Upon entering the war, Italy spread its occupation to the region of southern Albania beginning in Autumn 1916. Italian forces in 1916 recruited Albanian irregulars to serve alongside them. Italy, with the permission of Allied command, occupied Northern Epirus on 23 August 1916, forcing the neutralist Greek army to withdraw its occupation forces there.

In June 1917, Italy proclaimed central and southern Albania to be a protectorate of Italy. Northern Albania was allocated to the states of Serbia and Montenegro. By 31 October 1918, French and Italian forces had expelled the Austro-Hungarian army from Albania.

Dalmatia was a strategic region during World War I that both Italy and Serbia intended to seize from Austria-Hungary. Italy joined the Triple Entente Allies in 1915 upon agreeing to the London Pact, which guaranteed Italy the right to annex a large portion of Dalmatia in exchange for Italy's participation on the Allied side. From November 5 to 6 1918, Italian forces were reported to have reached Lissa, Lagosta, Sebenico, and other localities on the Dalmatian coast.

By the end of hostilities in November 1918, the Italian military had seized control of the entire portion of Dalmatia that had been guaranteed to Italy by the London Pact and, by 17 November, had seized Fiume as well. In 1918, Admiral Enrico Millo declared himself Italy's Governor of Dalmatia. The famous nationalist Gabriele d'Annunzio supported the seizure of Dalmatia and proceeded to Zadar in an Italian warship in December 1918.

Bulgaria

In the aftermath of the Balkan Wars, Bulgarian opinion turned against Russia and the western powers, whom the Bulgarians felt had done nothing to help them. Russia blamed Bulgaria for breaking up the alliance it had forged, and for starting the disastrous Second Balkan War against its former allies, and now looked to Serbia as a more reliable Slavic ally against Austria-Hungary.  The Bulgarian government aligned itself with Germany and Austria-Hungary, even though this meant also becoming an ally of the Ottomans, Bulgaria's traditional enemy. But Bulgaria now had no claims against the Ottomans, whereas Serbia, Greece and Romania (allies of Britain and France) were all in possession of lands that the Bulgarians perceived as Bulgarian.

Bulgaria, recuperating from the Balkan Wars, sat out the first year of World War I. When Germany promised Bulgaria all of Serbian Macedonia, parts of northeastern Serbia, as well as a new loan of 200,000,000 gold francs, Bulgaria declared war on Serbia in October 1915. Britain, France and Italy then declared war on Bulgaria.

Although Bulgaria, allied with Germany and Austria-Hungary, won military victories against Serbia and Romania: occupying much of Southern Serbia (taking Nish, Serbia's war capital on November 5), advancing into Greek Macedonia, and taking Dobruja from the Romanians in September 1916, the war soon became unpopular with the majority of Bulgarian people, who had suffered enormous economic hardship. The Russian Revolution of February 1917 had a significant effect in Bulgaria, spreading antiwar and anti-monarchist sentiment among the troops and in the cities.

In September 1918 a collective group of Serbian and Allied forces broke through on the Macedonian front in the Vardar Offensive. While Bulgarian forces stopped them in Dojran, Tsar Ferdinand was forced to sue for peace.

To head off the revolutionaries, Ferdinand abdicated in favour of his son Boris III. The revolutionaries were suppressed and the army disbanded. Under the Treaty of Neuilly (November 1919), Bulgaria lost its Aegean coastline in favour of the Principal Allied and Associated Powers (transferred later by them to Greece) and nearly all of its Macedonian territory to the new state of Yugoslavia, and had to give Dobruja back to the Romanians (see also Dobruja, Western Outlands, Western Thrace).

Macedonian front

In 1915, the Austro-Hungarians gained the military support of Germany and brought in Bulgaria as an ally. Serbian forces were attacked from both north and south and were forced to retreat through Montenegro and Albania, with only 155,000 Serbs, mostly soldiers, reaching the coast of the Adriatic Sea and evacuating to Greece by Allied ships.

The Macedonian front stabilized roughly around the Greek border after the intervention of a Franco-British-Italian force that had landed in Salonica. The German generals had not let the Bulgarian army advance towards Salonica because they had hoped that  they could persuade the Greeks to join the Central Powers.

In 1918, after a prolonged build-up, the Allies, under French General Franchet d'Esperey led a combined French, Serbian, Greek and British army attack out of Greece. His initial victories convinced the Bulgarian government to sue for peace. He then attacked north and defeated the German and Austro-Hungarian forces that tried to halt his offensive.

By October 1918, his army had recaptured all of Serbia and was preparing to invade Hungary proper, but the offensive was halted by the Hungarian leadership offering to surrender in November 1918.

Results
The French and British each kept six divisions on the Greek frontier from 1916 to the end of 1918. Originally, the French and British went to Greece to help Serbia, but with Serbia's conquest in the autumn of 1915, their continued presence did not produce major effects and so they mobilized the useful forces to the Western Front. 

In mid 1918, led by General Franchet d'Esperey, those forces were added to conduct a major offensive on the south flank of the Quadruplice (8 French division, 6 British division, 1 Italian division, 12 Serbian division). After the successful offensive launched on 10 September 1918, they freed Belgrade and forced Bulgaria to an armistice on 29 September. That had a significant effect by threatening Austria-Hungary (which agreed to an armistice on 4 November 1918) and then the German political leadership.

In fact, Keegan argued that "the installation of a violently nationalist and anti-Turkish government in Athens, led to Greek mobilization in the cause of the "Great Idea" - the recovery of the Greek empire in the east - which would complicate the Allied effort to resettle the peace of Europe for years after the war ended."

References

Sources

External links

Wars involving the Balkans
 
Campaigns and theatres of World War I
European theatre of World War I
Albania in World War I
Military operations of World War I involving Austria-Hungary
Bulgaria in World War I
Greece in World War I
Serbia in World War I
Military operations of World War I involving Germany
Military operations of World War I involving the Ottoman Empire
.
Modern history of the Balkans